Irene Hostettler is a road cyclist from Switzerland. She represented her nation at the 2003 and 2004 UCI Road World Championships.

References

External links
 profile at Procyclingstats.com

Year of birth missing (living people)
Swiss female cyclists
Living people
Place of birth missing (living people)